Yevseyenko is a Russian last name, a variant of Yevseyev. It is shared by the following people:
Andrey Yevseyenko, bass guitarist of the Kazakhstani metal band Holy Dragons
Nina Yevseyenko, founder of BTDigg, the first BitTorrent DHT search engine
Pavel Yawseenka (Pavel Yevseyenko) (b. 1980), Belarusian association football player
Sergey Yevseyenko, author of names published under the International Code of Zoological Nomenclature
Tetyana Yevseyenko, Ukrainian shooter who participated in the 2009 World Running Target Championships

References

Notes

Sources
И. М. Ганжина (I. M. Ganzhina). "Словарь современных русских фамилий" (Dictionary of Modern Russian Last Names). Москва, 2001. 

Russian-language surnames
